Jawahar Navodaya Vidyalaya, North 24 Parganas or locally called as JNV Banipur is a boarding, co-educational  school in North 24 Parganas district of West Bengal in India. Navodaya Vidyalayas are funded by the Indian Ministry of Human Resources Development and administered  by Navodaya Vidyalaya Smiti, an autonomous body under the ministry.

History 
The school was founded in 2003, and is a part of Jawahar Navodaya Vidyalaya schools. This school is administered and monitored by Patna regional office of Navodaya Vidyalaya Smiti. Initially school was operational at SCERT, west Bengal and shifted to its permanent site at Banipur on 1 May 2008.

Affiliations 
JNV North 24 Parganas is affiliated to Central Board of Secondary Education with affiliation number 2440003.

See also 

 List of JNV schools
 Jawahar Navodaya Vidyalaya, South 24 Parganas

References

External links 

 Official Website of JNV North 24 Parganas

Boarding schools in West Bengal
High schools and secondary schools in West Bengal
North 24 Parganas
Schools in North 24 Parganas district
Educational institutions established in 2003
2003 establishments in West Bengal